Polypoetes ineldo is a moth of the family Notodontidae. It is found in Colombia and Ecuador.

References

Moths described in 1933
Notodontidae of South America